Przasnysz is a town in north-central Poland. Located in the Masovian Voivodship, about 110 km north of Warsaw and about 115 km south of Olsztyn, it is the capital of Przasnysz County. It has 18,093 inhabitants (2004). It was one of the most important towns in Mazovia during the Middle Ages. Przasnysz was granted town privileges in 1427.

History 

The oldest traces of settlement in the area of Przasnysz come from the turn of the Bronze and Iron Age (around 700 BC). In the 13th century in Przasnysz, on the Węgierka River, there was a market settlement. There was also a hunting court of the Mazovian princes, described by Henryk Sienkiewicz in The Knights of the Cross. The name of the city according to folk sources comes from the miller Przaśnik, who hosted the stray hunting Duke Konrad I of Masovia and was then knighted with the surrounding lands.

Przasnysz's rapid development was due to its favorable location on the border between two economically important areas - the Kurpiowska Plain and the agricultural Ciechanowska Upland. On October 10, 1427, Przasnysz obtained town privileges under the Chełmno law from the Masovian Duke Janusz I of Warsaw. The town flourished in the 16th century, especially after the incorporation of Mazovia into the Crown in 1526. Przasnysz was a royal town and a county seat in the Ciechanów Land in the Masovian Voivodeship in the Greater Poland Province of the Polish Crown.

In 1576, Przasnysz became the seat of the non-castle starostwo (eldership). In 1648, the Przasnysz eldership was awarded to the defender of Zbaraż, Prince Jeremi Wiśniowiecki.

Partitions of Poland
After the defeat of the Kościuszko Uprising and the Third Partition of Poland (1795), Przasnysz became part of the Kingdom of Prussia as the seat of a large county including Ciechanów.

On January 30, 1807, Napoleon Bonaparte made a visit in Przasnysz.

In the years 1807–1815 Przasnysz was part of the Duchy of Warsaw, and then, after the Congress of Vienna, became part of so-called Congress Poland, which was part of the Russian Empire.

During World War I, in November and December 1914, heavy fighting took place near Przasnysz between the Russian and German armies. The city changed hands many times. February 24, 1915 was taken by the Germans, but on February 27 they were forced out by Russian troops from the First and Second Siberian Corps.

Interbellum
Poland regained independence after World War I in 1918, and Przasnysz was reintegrated with the reborn state. In August 1920, extremely fierce battles with the Bolshevik 15 Army took place near Przasnysz. For two weeks the city was occupied by the Soviet army. On August 21, Przasnysz was liberated by the 202 Infantry Regiment of the Volunteer Division of Colonel Adam Koc.

In the interwar period, Przasnysz was the capital of the poviat in the Warsaw Voivodeship. In the first years of independence, reconstruction from war damage continued. Many public buildings were built: power plant, junior high school and elementary school, agricultural school, city theater, stadium and sports house. The main occupation of the inhabitants of Przasnysz was still agriculture, craft and small trade. In 1938, Przasnysz had 8,000 residents, including approx. 3,000 Jews.

World War II

In the first days of the German invasion of Poland, which started World War II in September 1939, heavy fighting occurred nearby, between the Mazowiecka Cavalry Brigade under the command of Colonel Jan Karcz and the Germans. Afterwards the town was occupied by Germany and annexed directly into the Third Reich. It was renamed Praschnitz.

On September 10, 1939, the Einsatzgruppe V entered the town to commit various crimes against the populace. It immediately carried out mass searches of Polish offices, courts and organizations, arrested dozens of Poles, and expelled 70 Jews. The German police established a prison for Poles in the town, and a special court. In October and November 1939, the Germans executed 11 Poles at the local cemetery. Families of the victims were expelled to the so-called General Government. Local teachers and school principals were among Polish teachers and principals murdered in the Mauthausen concentration camp. 18 Poles from the town and county were murdered by the Russians in the Katyn massacre in 1940, including pre-war starosta Zygmunt Młot-Przepałkowski and the chief of the local police Zygmunt Pampuch. On December 3–4, 1940, the German gendarmerie expelled around 500 Poles, including old, ill and disabled people, who were then held for several days in a camp in Działdowo and afterwards deported in freight trains to the Kraków District of the General Government. A penal "education" forced labour camp was operated in the town from 1941 to 1943. There was a high death rate in the camp due to hunger, diseases, tortures and executions.

Despite such circumstances, Poles still managed to organize an underground resistance movement. On December 17, 1942, the Germans hanged five local leaders of Home Army at the main square.

Shortly after the Soviet Army seized the city on January 18, 1945, the NKVD began mass arrests and deportations of Polish patriots. The town then was restored to Poland, although with a Soviet-installed communist regime, which remained in power until the Fall of Communism in the 1980s.

Recent times
In the years 1945–1951, numerous armed units of the anti-communist underground operated near Przasnysz.

In the 1960s, the rapid development of the city began, slowed as a result of the administrative reform of 1975. In 1966, a branch of Zakład Aparatury Gospodarcza im. Georgi Dimitrov, where lightning arrestors were produced. For the needs of this plant, a school complex was established to house a vocational school and technical college.

Since January 1, 1999, Przasnysz is the seat of the county in the Masovian Voivodeship.

Sports
The local football club is MKS Przasnysz. It competes in the lower leagues.

Notable people
 Helga Adler (born 1943), German academic and politician (SED/PDS) 
 Stanisław Chełchowski (1866–1907), Polish naturalist and ethnographist
 Moisei Freidenberg (1858-1920) - Russian inventor and journalist
 Aleksander Kakowski (1862-1938) Archbishop of Warsaw
 Stanisław Kostka (1550-1568) - patron of children in the Catholic Church
 Bernard Kryszkiewicz (1915-1945) - Passionist priest
 Abraham Lichtstein - Av Beis Din (head of the rabbinical court) of Przasnysz
 Józef Stanisław Ostoja-Kotkowski (1922-1994) - artist
 Józef Sawa-Caliński (died 1771) - one of the leaders of the Bar Confederation

Coat of arms
The coat of arms of Przasnysz depicts a defensive wall made of red brick on a silver (white) shield, with three such towers of equal height. Each tower is covered with a conical red roof. Each tower has an entrance gate and one soaring hole above it, both black. Heraldic shield border black.

The heraldic image dates from the 16th century.

References

External links
Infoprzasnysz.com - local news from Przasnysz and district
ePrzasnysz.pl - Your Virtual City, local news from Przasnysz and district
 Jewish Community in Przasnysz on Virtual Shtetl
Przasnysz city government webpage
Przasnysz commune government webpage
Przasnysz on the map, via www.pilot.pl
webpage about the book "Misjonarze i Barbarzyńcy. Opowieści o codziennym życiu przasnyskiego ogólniaka w latach 1923-2005"
 Statut Miasta Przasnysz

Cities and towns in Masovian Voivodeship
Przasnysz County
Masovian Voivodeship (1526–1795)
Warsaw Voivodeship (1919–1939)